Konrad Georg (1914–1987) was a German film, stage and television actor. A veteran performer he appeared in numerous films and television programmes in West Germany. Between 1963 and 1966 he played the title role in the television crime series Kommissar Freytag.

Partial filmography

 Kommissar Freytag (1963–1966, TV series) - Kommissar Werner Freytag
 In Frankfurt sind die Nächte heiß (1966) - Kommissar Reinisch
 Is Paris Burning? (1966) - Gen. Field Marshal Model
 Zwei wie wir... und die Eltern wissen von nichts (1966) - Dr. Felten
 The Monk with the Whip (1967) - Keyston
 When Night Falls on the Reeperbahn (1967) - Hauptkommissar Zinner
 Dead Body on Broadway (1969) - Mr. Ross
 Seven Days Grace (1969) - Fromm
 Heintje: A Heart Goes on a Journey (1969) - Polizei-Inspektor
 Köpfchen in das Wasser, Schwänzchen in die Höh (1969) - Dr. Ahrens
 On the Reeperbahn at Half Past Midnight (1969) - Kriminalrat Norbert Krause
 11 Uhr 20 (1970, TV miniseries) - Herr Konrad
 Hotel by the Hour (1970) - Polizeirat Dr. Marschall
 Und Jimmy ging zum Regenbogen (1971) - Martin Landau
 Love Is Only a Word (1971) - Professor
 The Stuff That Dreams Are Made Of (1972) - Jacques Jean Garnot
 Trouble with Trixie (1972) - Mr. Brown
 Tears of Blood (1972)
 All People Will Be Brothers (1973) - Paradin
 Seven Deaths in the Cat's Eye (1973) - Campbell
 Story of a Cloistered Nun (1973) - Father Confessor
 Auch ich war nur ein mittelmäßiger Schüler (1974) - Krüger
 Only the Wind Knows the Answer (1974) - Prof. Jaubert
  (1975, TV miniseries) - Daubigeon
 Slavers (1977) - Attachè
 Randale (1983)

References

Bibliography 
 Martin Compart. Crime TV: Lexikon der Krimi-Serien. Bertz + Fischer, 2000.

External links 
 

1914 births
1987 deaths
German male film actors
German male stage actors
German male television actors
Actors from Mainz